Hsiao-Wuen Hon (Chinese: 洪小文; born: May 31, 1963) is a Taiwanese-US researcher in speech technology, and coauthor of the book Spoken Language Processing. He is Corporate Vice President of Microsoft and Chairman of Microsoft's Asia-Pacific R&D Group.

Life 
Hon is a U.S. citizen born in Taiwan. Hon represented Taiwan in the International Mathematics Olympiad in high school. He received his bachelor's degree in electrical engineering from National Taiwan University in 1985. In 1986, he entered Carnegie Mellon University to study under professor Raj Reddy, and later received a PhD in computer science.

Career 
After earning his PhD in 1992, Hon joined Apple, where he led research and development for the company's Chinese Dictation Kit. In 1995, he joined Microsoft as a senior researcher in their SAPI and speech engine technologies. 

Hon was involved in the creation of Microsoft Research Asia in Beijing, the firm's first R&D operation in China. He was transferred to Microsoft's Seattle headquarters in 1998, promoted to Microsoft Voice Products Chief Technology Architect, then returned to Beijing in 2004 as Deputy Managing Director of Microsoft Research Asia.  Hon founded and managed Microsoft Search Technology Center from 2005 to 2007 and led development of Microsoft's Bing search product in Asia-Pacific. He was  named Managing Director in 2007. In 2014, Hon was appointed Chairman of Microsoft Asia-Pacific R&D Group and in October 2015, he became Senior Vice President of Microsoft Corporation. 

Hon has served on the Ambarella board of directors since 2017. He is a faculty member of the Schwarzman Scholars program and an adjunct professor with the Chinese University of Hong Kong's Department of Systems Engineering and Engineering Management.

Selected publications 

 R. Song, Q. Guo, R. Zhang, G. Xin, J. Wen, Y. Yu, H.W. Hon, “Select-the-Best-Ones: A new way to judge relative relevance” , Information Processing & Management, Volume 47, Issue 1, Elsevier, January 2011, page 37-52.
 R. Song, Z. Luo, J. Nie, Y. Yu, and H.W. Hon, “Identification of ambiguous queries in web search”, International Journal on Information Processing and Management, Volume 45, Issue 2, March 2009, page 216-229.
 B Erol, J Luo, S.F. Chang, M Etoh, H.W. Hon, Q. Lin, V. Setlur, “Mobile Media Search: Has Media Search Finally Found its Perfect Platform?”, in ACM Multimedia 2009, Oct. 19-23, 2009.
 J Cohen, M Etoh, H.W. Hon, J Luo, J. Schalkwyk, “Mobile Multimedia Search”, in IEEE International Conference on Acoustics, Speech and Signal Processing, April 19–24, 2009.
 Y. Cao, C.Y. Lin, Y. Yu, and H.W. Hon. “Recommending Questions Using the MDL-based Tree Cut Model”, in Proceedings of the 17th International World Wide Web Conference (WWW2008), Beijing, China, April 21–25, 2008.
 R. Song, M. J. Taylor, J. Wen, H.W. Hon, and Y. Yu. “Viewing Term Proximity from a Different Perspective”, Book chapter in book: Advances in Information Retrieval by Springer Berlin/Heidelberg, page 346-357.
 W. Gao, C. Niu, J.Y. Nie, M. Zhou, J. Hu, K-F Wong, H.W. Hon “Cross-Lingual Query Suggestion Using Query Logs of Different Languages”, 30th annual international ACM SIGIR-2007 conference, Amsterdam, Holland.
 R. Song, Z. Luo, J.R. Wen, Y. Yu, H.W. Hon, “Identifying ambiguous queries in web search”, Proceedings of the 16th international conference on World Wide Web 2007, Banff, Alberta, Canada.
 Y. Cao, J. Xu, T.Y. Liu, H. Li, Y. Huang, H.W. Hon, “Adapting ranking SVM to document retrieval”, 29th annual international ACM SIGIR-2006 conference, Seattle, WA.

Awards and honors 
 He is an IEEE fellow and Microsoft Distinguished Scientist
 He was granted the Great Wall Friendship Award by the Beijing Municipal Government

References

External links 
 Asia Vision Series: Dr. Hsiao-Wuen Hon
 The AI Spring Is Coming
 Hsiao-Wuen HON-Speakers-Boao Forum for Asia
 Hsiao-Wuen Hon | Author | Microsoft Academic

1963 births
Living people
Microsoft Research people